LesBiGay Radio was a radio show catering to the LGBT population of Chicago, Illinois. A contraction of lesbian, bisexual, and gay, the radio program was founded in June 1994 by Alan Amberg, and broadcast until April 2001, just shy of its 7th anniversary.

It was America's only daily show for the LGBT community, with 520 hours broadcast a year.

The show was inducted into the Chicago LGBT Hall of Fame in 1998.

References 

Radio stations in Chicago
LGBT-related mass media in the United States
LGBT culture in Chicago
Radio stations established in 1994
Radio stations disestablished in 2001
1994 establishments in Illinois
2001 disestablishments in Illinois